Elvir Kafedžić (born 19 December 1981) is a Bosnian-American footballer.

Youth and college soccer 
Kafedžić grew up in Bosnia and Herzegovina in the aftermath of the Bosnian War, before his family immigrated to Berlin, Germany in the early 1990s. In 1999, Kafedžić and his family moved to St. Louis, Missouri, where he attended Affton High School for one year. He subsequently played college soccer at Lindenwood University, where he was part of the Lions team that won 2004 NAIA National Championship.

During his college years he also played with the St. Louis Strikers in the USL Premier Development League.

Professional playing career 
Kafedžić has extensive professional indoor soccer experience. He played with the St. Louis Steamers, Chicago Storm and California Cougars, and was a member of US national futsal team that traveled to play in tournaments in Brazil and Spain in 2007.

Kafedžić signed his first professional outdoor contract in 2010 when he was signed by AC St. Louis of the USSF Division 2 Professional League.

Coaching 
In 2013, Kafedžić founded the St. Louis Dragons youth program. Kafedžić became a coach in the St. Louis City SC academy in 2021.

References

External links 
 AC St. Louis bio
 California Cougars bio

1981 births
Living people
People from Foča
Association football forwards
Bosnia and Herzegovina footballers
St. Louis Strikers players
St. Louis Steamers (1998–2006) players
Chicago Storm players
California Cougars players
St. Louis Illusion players
AC St. Louis players
Illinois Piasa
Rockford Rampage players
St. Louis Ambush (2013–) players
Professional Arena Soccer League players
Major Arena Soccer League players
USL League Two players
USSF Division 2 Professional League players
Bosnia and Herzegovina expatriate footballers
Expatriate soccer players in the United States
Bosnia and Herzegovina expatriate sportspeople in the United States
St. Louis City SC